Fundurii may refer to one of two communes in Glodeni District, Moldova:

Fundurii Noi
Fundurii Vechi